Andrine og Kjell is a 1952 Norwegian drama film directed by Kåre Bergstrøm, starring Inger Marie Andersen and Toralv Maurstad. Andrine (Andersen) is attending a private secondary school, and rents a room with the family of her classmate Kjell (Maurstad). She is at first put off by Kjell's rebellious behaviour, but as she gradually begins to understand him, the two develop a closer relationship.

External links
 
 Andrine og Kjell at Filmweb.no (Norwegian)

1952 films
1952 drama films
Norwegian drama films
Norwegian black-and-white films
1950s Norwegian-language films
Films directed by Kåre Bergstrøm